James Hardy may refer to:

Sports
 James Hardy (wide receiver) (1985–2017), American football wide receiver
 Jim Hardy (1923–2019), American football quarterback
 James Hardy (American football coach) (born 1981), American football coach
 James Hardy (basketball) (1956–2020), American professional basketball player
 James Hardy (rower) (1923–1986), American rower and Olympic gold medalist
 James Hardy (sailor) (born 1932), Olympic Australian sailor and America's Cup skipper
 J. J. Hardy (James Jerry Hardy, born 1982), American professional baseball player
 James Hardy (footballer) (born 1996), English footballer

Others
 James Hardy (sculptor) (1632-1721) English sculptor
 James Hardy (naturalist) (1815–1898), Scottish naturalist and antiquarian
 James Hardy (surgeon) (1918–2003), American surgeon
 James D. Hardy Jr., American academic and historian
James Hardy Jnr. (1832–1889),  British artist
 James Earl Hardy (born 1966), American playwright, novelist, and journalist
 James Greene Hardy (1795–1856), Kentucky politician and orator; Lt. Governor of Kentucky
 James Hardy, character in Andy Hardy Meets Debutante

See also
 James Hardie (disambiguation)